Shongelo Lake is a lake in the U.S. state of Mississippi.

Shongelo is a name derived from the Choctaw language meaning "cypress tree".

References

Lakes of Mississippi
Bodies of water of Smith County, Mississippi
Mississippi placenames of Native American origin